Homadena was a town of ancient Phrygia on the road from Apamea to Eumeneia, inhabited during Roman and Byzantine times. Its name does not occur in ancient authors but is inferred from epigraphic and other evidence.

Its site is located near Gümüşsu (formerly, Homa) in Asiatic Turkey.

References

Populated places in Phrygia
Former populated places in Turkey
Roman towns and cities in Turkey
Populated places of the Byzantine Empire
History of Denizli Province